The Kavşak Bendi Dam is a concrete-face rock-fill dam on the Seyhan River bordering Kozan and Aladağ districts in Adana Province, Turkey. Construction on the dam began in 2008 and the first generator was commissioned in 2013. The two remaining generators were commissioned by April 2014. The primary purpose of the dam is hydroelectric power generation.

See also

Köprü Dam – upstream on the Göksu River
Yedigöze Dam – downstream

References

Dams in Adana Province
Concrete-face rock-fill dams
Hydroelectric power stations in Turkey
Dams on the Seyhan River
Dams completed in 2013
2014 establishments in Turkey
Energy infrastructure completed in 2014
21st-century architecture in Turkey